Keyword may refer to:

Computing
 Keyword (Internet search), a word or phrase typically used by bloggers or online content creator to rank a web page on a particular topic
 Index term, a term used as a keyword to documents in an information system such as a catalog or a search engine
 Keyword advertising, a form of online advertising
 Keyword clustering, a search engine optimization technique
 A reserved word in a programming language

Other
 Keyword (linguistics), word which occurs in a text more often than we would expect to occur by chance alone
 Keyword (rhetoric), a word that academics use to reveal the internal structure of an author's reasoning
 Keywords: A Vocabulary of Culture and Society, 1973 non-fiction book by Raymond Williams
 "Keyword" (Tohoshinki song), a 2008 J-pop song